Viên An is a  commune in the Ngọc Hiển District of Cà Mau Province, Vietnam, approximately 56 kilometres from Cà Mau city. It borders Rạch Gốc on the Cà Mau Peninsula of the South China Sea near the southernmost tip of Vietnam.

The Cua Lon River lies to the north and Tân An to the east. The economy is based primarily on fishing, and the seafood industry, especially shrimp and green lobster.

Communes of Cà Mau province
Populated places in Cà Mau province